Konstantinos Giotas (Greek: Κωνσταντίνος Γιώτας; born 18 February 1980) is a Greek professional football player who last played as a centre back in the Football League for Niki Volos.

External links
 AEL 1964 FC Official
 Profile at Mysports.gr
 Profile at FL-News.gr

1980 births
Footballers from Trikala
Living people
Greek footballers
Athlitiki Enosi Larissa F.C. players
Association football defenders
Niki Volos F.C. players
Anagennisi Karditsa F.C. players
Iraklis Psachna F.C. players